Bus Route 104 may refer to:

Route 104 (MTA Maryland), a bus route in Baltimore, operating to Johns Hopkins Hospital, part of the Route 13 bus route
SEPTA Route 104, Philadelphia
 VTA Express Bus Route 104 in Santa Clara, California. See Penitencia Creek (VTA).
 Route 104 between Pak Tin and Kennedy Town in Hong Kong.  See List of bus routes in Hong Kong.

See also
 List of highways numbered 104

104